John Street is a street in Downtown Toronto. It runs from Stephanie Street and Grange Park in the north to the Metro Toronto Convention Centre on Front Street in the south. It is home to a number of Toronto's cultural institutions, including buildings for the CBC, CTV, Toronto International Film Festival. The National Post has described it as "Running directly through the entertainment district, its spine connects many great cultural institutions, popular retail outlets, restaurants and soon-to-be-built condos." The City of Toronto has dubbed the street a "Cultural Corridor" and a report calls it "the centrepiece of the Entertainment District."

History
John, and other streets in the area, were named after John Graves Simcoe, the founder of York (today Toronto) and the first Lieutenant Governor of Upper Canada.

During the typhus epidemic of 1847, 863 Irish immigrants died of typhus in fever sheds at the Toronto Hospital on the northwest corner of King and John Street.

Route description
John Street begins at Front Street. Just to the south is the Rogers Centre and CN Tower, located on the former railway lands. John street used to extend further south, over the railway to Lake Shore Boulevard. Today a pedestrian mall begins at the terminus of John, connecting it to these structures and to Bremner Boulevard. South of Bremner what used to be John is now named Rees Street. The John Street Roundhouse and John Street Pumping Station retain their original names, despite no longer being on John.

From Front St to Queen St W John is a four lane road. Once an industrial area, the street it now lined by a series of office buildings and condominiums that have been built in recent decades. In the 1990s downtown expended westward as the first office towers were built along John. These include Canadian Broadcasting Centre, headquarters of the Canadian Broadcasting Corporation, and Metro Hall, the former headquarters of Metro Toronto. In the 2000s condominiums began to be built throughout the Entertainment District, and the southern part of John is now home to a number of condo towers.

North of Adelaide St, John narrows to three lanes and changes in character, becoming one of the central nodes of the entertainment district. The street in this section is mostly lined with low rise commercial buildings. These include a number of restaurants, the Scotiabank Theatre, a bowling alley, CTV Queen Street, the National Film Board of Canada Mediatheque, and the former location of the Circa nightclub, once the largest of the clubs in the entertainment district.

North of Queen Street, John Street narrows further to two lanes. The northernmost section of the street is mostly residential, lined with a series of mid-rise apartment buildings and condominiums, mostly dating from middle of the 20th century. John St reaches its northern terminus at Grange Park, which gives its name to the Grange Park neighbourhood. A path through the park follows the Axis of John Street, leading to The Grange, a heritage manor. The manor is now attached to the Art Gallery of Ontario and OCAD University is also adjacent to the park.

Future

The Globe and Mail described John Street's current character as "a largely utilitarian stretch of broken pavement, parking lots, chain restaurants and media company headquarters." Plans are underway to turn John into the hub of Toronto's Entertainment District by widening the sidewalks and creating a tree lined boulevard that would serve as a central access to the neighbourhood. In places where John is four lanes, it will be reduced to two to make more room for sidewalks and trees. The plan was developed by the local Business Improvement Association and the City of Toronto government and is the current top planning priority for the Entertainment District.

Landmarks

See also
Weston, Ontario, a historic community in Toronto, also has a street named John Street

References

Streets in Toronto